Historic counties may refer to:

Historic counties of England, subdivisions of England established for administration by the Normans
Historic counties of Ireland, areas in Ireland separate from the county corporates that existed in some of the larger towns and cities
Historic counties of Scotland, the principal local government divisions of Scotland until 1975
Historic counties of Wales, ancient sub-divisions of Wales
Counties of Trinidad and Tobago
Counties of Moldova
Former counties of Romania